, which means "Hither like thither" (compare ), is the title of the only existing Pennsylvania German-language newspaper.

Publication 
Since 1997, the publication is distributed twice a year. More than 100 Pennsylvania German authors—members of Lutheran and UCC churches as well as Old Order Amish and Old Order Mennonites—have already contributed pieces of prose, poems and newspaper articles. The founder and publisher is Michael Werner (Ober-Olm, Germany), who also served as president of the German-Pennsylvanian Association between 2003 and 2010. On their websites, one can find poems, stories, videos and lessons in the dialect. In 2011,  has created a " Award for Pennsylvania German Literature" in cooperation with the Palatine Writers Contest in Bockenheim (Germany) and Kutztown University's Pennsylvania German Minor Program. Since 2013,  is printed in Pennsylvania, and in 2015, the editorial headquarter was moved to the Pennsylvania German Cultural Heritage Center at Kutztown University.

Editors 
The publication was founded in 1996. Since 2013, an editorial team is responsible for the whole publishing process.

 Donmoyer, Patrick (* 1985 / USA): Folk culture specialist, site manager at the Pennsylvania German Cultural Heritage Center (Kutztown University), board member of Groundhog Lodge No. 1.
 Esther, Naomi (USA)(* 1990 / USA): Co-Worker at the Pennsylvania German Cultural Heritage Center (Kutztown University)
 Madenford, Douglas (* 1980 / USA): High school teacher (High German), youtuber, blogger, author, musician.
 Quinter, Edward (* 1950 / USA): High school teacher (High German), author, co-organizer of the "Pennsylvania German Writing Festival" at the Kutztown Folk Festival.
 Richardson, Amanda (* 1987 / USA): Co-Worker at the Pennsylvania German Cultural Heritage Center (Kutztown University).
 Werner, Michael (* 1965 / Germany): Publisher, journalist, author, translator, musician. Founder of the German-Pennsylvanian Archive, the German-Pennsylvanian Association and Grundsau Lodsch No. 19 im alte Land.

External links 
The website was started in January 2002 and features various Pennsylvania German programs.

Winners of the  Award 
The award is given by the jury of the Palatine Dialect Poets Contest in Bockenheim. (Palatinate, Germany).

Books

Hiwwe wie Driwwes Featured Artist of the Year

Scientific reception 

David L Valuska & William Donner, Kutztown University (2004): "This journal and an associated internet site are leading sources for information about the Pennsylvania German language."

Patrick Donmoyer, Pennsylvania German Cultural Heritage Center at Kutztown University (2012): „Hiwwe wie Driwwe is the most widely-known dialect publication in the world for Pennsylvania German / Palatine German dialect, with a strong readership throughout the US, Canada and Europe."

C. Richard Beam, Center for Pennsylvania German Studies at Millersville University (2014): "Hiwwe wie Driwwe has succeeded in establishing a bridge between the Old and the New World and it has succeeded in the preservation of the Pennsylvania German dialect and culture."

Sheily Rohrer, Penn State University (2017): "Started as a newspaper by Michael Werner in Ebertsheim, Germany, Hiwwe wie Driwwe on the internet and in print has mediated a transnational conversation of dialect writers with one another."

Claire Noble, Colorado (2018): "In 1890, there were more than 1,000 German-language newspapers in America. Today, only a handful remains, such as Hiwwe wie Driwwe, the last remaining German newspaper in Pennsylvania."

References

External links 
 Hiwwe wie Driwwe | Die Pennsylvanisch-Deitsch Zeiding
 Rheinland-Pfälzisches Literaturlexikon

Newspapers published in Pennsylvania
Pennsylvania Dutch language
German-language newspapers published in Pennsylvania
Pennsylvania culture
Pennsylvania Dutch culture